Araf (English: The Abortion) is a 2006 Turkish film directed by Biray Dalkiran.

Credits
 Country: Turkey
 Genre: Thriller

Synopsis
Inspired by Japanese horror movies, the movie tells the story of Eda (Akasya Aslitürkmen), a dancer who fell in love with Cihan (Kubilay Tunçer), her married lover. When she realized that she was four months pregnant, she thought that an abortion would solve the problem. On the same night that her dance academy mate Oya (Deniz Soyarslan) made the solo show instead of her, Eda had an illegal abortion, risking her life. Three years later she marries a photographer, Cenk (Murat Yıldırım). When she gets pregnant again, the ghost of the fetus from the abortion comes to haunt her.

Reception 
The film was "shunned" for both its overtly misogynistic tones, poor directing, and sloppy script.

References

External links
 

2000s thriller films
2006 films
2000s Turkish-language films
Films set in Turkey
Turkish horror films
Films about abortion